In the auditory system, the columella contributes to hearing in amphibians, reptiles and birds. The columella form thin, bony structures in the interior of the skull and serve the purpose of transmitting sounds from the eardrum. It is an evolutionary homolog of the stapes, one of the auditory ossicles in mammals.

In many species, the extracolumella is a cartilaginous structure that grows in association with the columella. During development, the columella is derived from the dorsal end of the hyoid arch.

Evolution 
The evolution of the columella is closely related to the evolution of the jaw joint. It is an ancestral homolog of the stapes, and is derived from the hyomandibular bone of fishes.

As the columella is derived from the hyomandibula, many of its functional relationships remain the same. The columella resides in the air-filled tympanic cavity of the middle ear. The footplate, or proximal end of the columella, rests in the oval window. Sound is conducted through the oval window to the interior of the otic capsule.  This motion ultimately stimulates sensory cells in the inner ear.

In the transition of tetrapods from sea to land, the earliest appearance of functional columella appeared in temnospondyls.

Extracolumella 
Crocodilians evolved to lift the head and body off the ground, isolating the head from ground vibrations. Under selective pressure to detect airborne sound vibrations, the columella in crocodilians have become more slender and reduce their mass. The extracolumella, a cartilaginous outgrowth on the distal end of the columella, couples the columella to the tympanum to conduct sound from the exterior air.

Birds and modern crocodilians have evolved a trifurcated columella, which forms a Y-shaped support structure on the surface of the tympanic membrane. In birds, this is thought to increase the surface area of the columellar footplate, thus lowering the threshold of hearing and improving the detection of airborne sound waves.

Anatomy in amphibians

Frogs 
In frogs, the extracolumella is simple and club-shaped.

Anatomy in reptiles 
In reptiles, the columella function to transduce sound through the middle ear as part of the auditory pathway. The columella is relatively straight and moves in a piston-like motion in response to vibration. Due to the rigid bony structure, the columella primarily responds to low-frequency vibrations transmitted through the ground.

Crocodilians 
In crocodilians, the columella arises from a proximal and a distal component which develop into the columella and extracolumella, respectively. It is typically trifurcated, with three finger-like projections supporting it against the tympanic membrane. The extracolumella remains cartilaginous while the columella ossifies during development. The connection between the columella and extracolumella remains flexible over the animal's lifetime.

Snakes 

Snakes have lost a tympanic membrane, and hence a distal attachment for the columella. The columella is instead connected to the quadrate bone of the jaw. Thus, snakes are able to detect and localize ground vibrations through the lower jaw, rather than the sides of the head.

Worm lizards 
In Amphisbaenia, the extracolumella is particularly lengthened and firmly connects with a layer of skin over dentary bone of the lower jaw. This connection appears to facilitate detection of airborne vibrations in the facial area. The embedding in the skin often occurs at a specially enlarged labial scale. As a result, the amphisbaenian is able to detect substrate vibrations as it burrows through the ground while protecting the internal ear from damage. Amphisbaenians otherwise lack an external ear structure, likely due to selective pressure to protect the middle and inner ears from damage as the animal burrows.

Birds 
In birds, the columella is anchored to the conical tympanic membrane at an acute angle, rather than a 90-degree angle relative to the plane of the tympanic membrane. This is thought to provide a lever advantage in conducting airborne sound from the distal to the proximal end of the columella.

Development in chickens 
In chick embryos, the primordial columella arises from a mesenchymal condensation. Chondrification of the columella occurs earlier than the extracolumella. During endochondral ossification, the columella ossifies from two origins of periosteum: the shaft and the footplate.

Homology in mammals 
Within mammals and other synapsids the columella has evolved into the stapes, a homologous bone within the newly evolved inner ear. As the tympanic cavity evolved to reduce in size, the columella shortened in length. The stirrup-shaped articular processes of the columella inspired a new name for this auditory ossicle, the stapes. The auditory ossicles continue to function in conducting transmitting sound through the auditory pathway; however, they have lost their function in conducting low frequency ground vibrations.

Later-arising reptiles with columella likely evolved stronger limbs and a more crawling posture, which removed the body from the ground and prevented the transmission of ground-conducted sounds. The skin over the ear evolved into the eardrum, which allowed for the detection of high-frequency airborne vibrations. In mammals, the newly specialized ossicles function to transduce and amplify these vibrations along the auditory pathway.

Artificial columella 
In humans, artificially made columella may be produced as autografts from cortical bone. These prostheses are used as replacements for the stapes in ear surgery to correct for hearing problems (such as cholesteatoma or re-perforation).

References 

Reptile anatomy
Bird anatomy
Amphibian anatomy
Auditory system
Ossicles